The Man With Blond Hair is a play by Norman Krasna based on a true story. Although Krasna became better known for comedy this was a drama; the writer later said that he "really wrote" the play "to win the Nobel Peace Prize". The play only ran for 7 performances on Broadway. This failure prompted him to return to comedy and Krasna wrote Dear Ruth his most popular hit.

Plot
Two Nazi airmen, Rudolph and Stumer, escape internment in Canada and find themselves in New York where they are arrested.  A policeman arranges for them to escape so the policeman may recapture and beat them.

Stumer escapes but Rudolph is captured by a gang of kids. They are about to force him to jump off a roof when Ruth, fiancée of one boy Involved, takes him away to her apartment via the fire escape.

At Ruth's apartment he is fed and well treated by her mother, while the boys search for him. One of the boys is shot by the police before he is about to spot Rudolph. Rudolph gives himself up to the police.

Original cast
Eleanor Lynn as Ruth Hoffmann
Rex Williams as Rudolph
Bernard Lenrow as Stumer
Dora Weissman as Mrs Hoffmann
Coby Ruskin as Harry
Robert Williams as Matt
Alfred Ryder as John
James Gregory as Frank Connors
Curt Conway as Sidney
Rex Williams as Carl
George Wallach as messenger boy
Francis de Sales as McCarthy
Owen Martin as Harvey

Background
In September 1941 Krasna arrived in New York to begin rehearsals. The play was then called Fire Escape. RKO were financing the entire production and Krasna was making his Broadway directorial debut.

Reception
The Christian Science Monitor called the play "essentially immature and inconclusive."

The New York Times said it "contains several interesting scenes, offers two excellent tenement settings... and bits of engaging acting... this correspondent was never bored... but it could never believe his melodrama. It looked very like a loosely contrived and whimsical play, more interested in bravaura scenes than integrity."

Production history
The Broadway production closed after seven performances. This led to Krasna delay plans to put on a play he had written with Groucho Marx, The Time of Elizabeth. "I got burned on the other one; we want to be careful next time", said Krasna. Krasna sold the story to the movies. In October 1943 Warners announced they purchased Night Action as a vehicle for Helmut Dantine and were to make it after Dantine finished Northern Pursuit. Warners did not say how much they paid for it. In October George Sklar was assigned to write the script. However the film was not made.

References

External links
 
  (archive)
 Review of 1941 Broadway production at Variety

1941 plays
Plays by Norman Krasna
Broadway plays
Plays about World War II
Plays set in New York City